The 1964 Bucknell Bison football team was an American football team that represented Bucknell University during the 1964 NCAA College Division football season. Bucknell was awarded the Lambert Cup as the best small-college football team in the East.

In its seventh and final season under head coach Bob Odell, the team compiled a 7–2 record, 4–1 against division opponents. Despite winning the Lambert Cup, Bucknell finished second in the University Division of the Middle Atlantic Conference. John Barron was the team captain.

The team played its home games at Memorial Stadium on the university campus in Lewisburg, Pennsylvania.

Schedule

References

Bucknell
Bucknell Bison football seasons
Bucknell Bison football